HLA-B50 (B50) is an HLA-B serotype. B50 is a split antigen from the B21 broad antigen, the sister serotype B49. The serotype identifies the more common HLA-B*50 gene products. (For terminology help see: HLA-serotype tutorial)

Serotype

The B*5002 by serotype definition is a B45 serotype.

Allele distribution

References

5